London Calling is a music festival held twice a year in Paradiso, Amsterdam and focuses on the latest trends and bands in music, with the main focus on the UK. Since the festival started in 1992 it has been acknowledged as the main showcase festival of the Netherlands for British music and is therefore seen as the gateway to a breakthrough in the Benelux for promising, new British bands. The name of the festival is taken from the famous third album by English punk band The Clash.

The festival was first held in 1992 with four bands (including the Jennifers, the band that later renamed itself into Supergrass) and was organised yearly ever since. In the first decade and a half the festival focused mainly on the latest British bands with an occasional non-British act and turned into the country's main showcase festival for new British music. Bands like Kaiser Chiefs, The Darkness, Franz Ferdinand, Supergrass, Blur, Editors, Bloc Party, Suede, The Libertines, Placebo, Ash, Skunk Anansie, Snow Patrol and Klaxons among others, played the festival before their breakthrough. For a lot of these bands it was their first gig in Amsterdam or even outside of the UK. Because of the chance to see soon-to-be-big bands play in a relatively small venue (capacity: 1500 for the big room, 300 for the small room) the festival usually sells out quickly.

The last few years the festival has broadened its concept and not only focuses on the latest British bands, but on new bands/acts and trends in general, be it Britpop or dance music. This has resulted in the festival now boasting about 25 bands over two days, or over 35 acts in 2007 and 2009, when the festival lasted for three days. Various theme nights under the London Calling moniker have been organised at the venue, including 'London Calling Presents Artrocker Artrocker' and 'London Calling Goes Glasgow'.

Originator–program director of the festival is Ben Kamsma.

In 2007 the festival won the England Rocks! Award by tourism agency Enjoy England for its continuous support for British music.

Editions

References

External links
 Official website of the London Calling festival
 Official website of Paradiso

Music festivals in the Netherlands
Culture in Amsterdam
Recurring events established in 1992
1992 establishments in the Netherlands